The 1930 Mississippi College Choctaws football team was an American football team that represented Mississippi College as a member of the Southern Intercollegiate Athletic Association (SIAA) during the 1930 college football season. In their seventh year under head coach Stanley L. Robinson, the team compiled a 7–2 record.

Schedule

References

Mississippi College
Mississippi College Choctaws football seasons
Mississippi College Choctaws football